Philip Charles Woodland from the Cambridge University, Cambridge, Cambs, UK was named Fellow of the Institute of Electrical and Electronics Engineers (IEEE) in 2013 for contributions to large vocabulary speech recognition.

References 

Fellow Members of the IEEE
Living people
Year of birth missing (living people)
Engineering professors at the University of Cambridge